The Georgia Mountains Region or North Georgia mountains or Northeast Georgia is an area that starts in the northeast corner of Georgia, United States, and spreads in a westerly direction. The mountains in this region are in the Blue Ridge mountain chain that ends in Georgia.  At over 1 billion years of age, the Blue Ridge mountains are among the oldest mountains in the United States and sometimes mistaken to be the oldest mountains in the world (they are only about one third of the age of South Africa's 3.6 billion year old Barberton greenstone belt.). The mountains in this region are also a part of the vast system of North American mountains known as the Appalachian Mountains that spans most of the United States longitudally along the eastern areas of the nation and terminates in Alabama.

The region is known for its ruggedness and scenic beauty.  The Cherokee who lived in these mountains called them ᏌᏆᎾᎦ/Sah-ka-na'-ga - "Blue Smoke Mountains". Large portions of the North Georgia mountains are included in the more than  that comprise the Chattahoochee National Forest.

In popular culture

The Chattooga River was used as a setting for the fictional Cahulawassee River in the book and film Deliverance and was filmed in the Tallulah Gorge southeast of Clayton, Georgia and on the Chattooga River.

The Adult Swim animated series Squidbillies takes place in Dougal County, a fictional county located in the North Georgia mountains.

See also

References

External links
 Lifestyle publication of the North Georgia Mountains  

Regions of Georgia (U.S. state)